Uğur Polat (born 4 September 1961, in Istanbul) is a Turkish actor.

He graduated from theatre department of Mimar Sinan Fine Arts University. He was lecturer in Anadolu University. He joined the Ankara Art Theatre (Ankara Sanat Tiyatrosu). He has appeared in more than forty films.
His first film was Mist in 1988 in which he played the role of Erol.

He had leading roles in hit series Yeditepe İstanbul, Sultan Makamı and comedy crime series Ulan İstanbul. He was cast in popular series such as "Yargı", "Kayıp Şehir", "Son", "Türkan", "Sıcak Saatler", "Kurtuluş".

Filmography

Theatre 
 Çehov Makinası: Matei Vișniec - İstanbul Devlet Tiyatrosu - 2012
 Kredi Kartı-Vak'a aaaaa!: Cüneyt Çalışkur - İstanbul Devlet Tiyatrosu - 2010
 Vur Yağmala Yeniden: Mark Ravenhill - Tiyatro Dot
 Sansürcü: Anthony Neilson - Tiyatro Dot
 Ben Ruhi Bey Nasılım: Edip Cansever - İstanbul Devlet Tiyatrosu - 2001
 Patron: Tarık Buğra - İstanbul Devlet Tiyatrosu - 2000
 Kuvai Milliye: Nâzım Hikmet - İstanbul Devlet Tiyatrosu - 1999
 İçerdekiler: Melih Cevdet Anday - İstanbul Devlet Tiyatrosu - 1995
 Olmayan Kadın: Kenan Işık - İstanbul Devlet Tiyatrosu - 1994
 Hamlet: William Shakespeare - İstanbul Devlet Tiyatrosu - 1993
 Küçük Burjuvalar: Bertolt Brecht - İstanbul Devlet Tiyatrosu - 1992
 Oresteia: Aiskhylos - İstanbul Devlet Tiyatrosu - 1991
 Fırtına: William Shakespeare - İstanbul Devlet Tiyatrosu - 1991
 Dün Gece Yolda Giderken Çok Komik Bir Şey Oldu: Larry Gelbert\Bert Shevelove - İstanbul Devlet Tiyatrosu - 1990
 Ballar Balını Buldum (Yunus Emre): Nezihe Araz - İstanbul Devlet Tiyatrosu - 1989
 Odissinbad: Ksenya Kalogerapulu - İstanbul Devlet Tiyatrosu - 1988
 Altı Kişi Yazarını Arıyor: Luigi Pirandello - İstanbul Devlet Tiyatrosu - 1988
 Hoşu'nun Utancı: Şinasi Ekicioğlu - İstanbul Devlet Tiyatrosu - 1987
 Yedi Kocalı Hürmüz: Sadık Şendil - İstanbul Devlet Tiyatrosu - 1987
 Deli İbrahim: Turan Oflazoğlu - Adana Devlet Tiyatrosu - 1987
 Tohum ve Toprak: Orhan Asena - İstanbul Devlet Tiyatrosu - 1986
 Akvaryum (oyun): Aldo Nicolai - Ankara Devlet Tiyatrosu - 1986
 Düşüş (oyun): Nahid Sırrı Örik\Kemal Bekir - İstanbul Devlet Tiyatrosu - 1984
 Hikâye-i Mahmut Bedrettin: Mehmet Akan - Ankara Sanat Tiyatrosu - 1980
 Oyun Nasıl Oynanmalı: (Vasıf Öngören - Ankara Sanat Tiyatrosu - 1979
 Kafatası: Nâzım Hikmet - Ankara Sanat Tiyatrosu - 1979
 Ferhat ile Şirin: Nâzım Hikmet - Ankara Sanat Tiyatrosu - 1979

Awards

References

External links

1961 births
Male actors from Istanbul
Living people
Turkish male film actors
Best Actor Golden Orange Award winners
Turkish male stage actors
Istanbul University alumni